Abu'l-Husayn Muhammad ibn Salih ibn Umm Shayban al-Hashimi was a member of the extended Abbasid dynasty who became chief  in Iraq in 973/4–975, under the Buyid dynasty.

Life
Muhammad ibn Salih was born in Kufa in 905/6. He came to Baghdad in 928/9, and married a daughter of the chief  Abu Umar Muhammad.  

He became a  himself in Baghdad, first over the City of al-Mansur, then in January/February 947, over all of West Baghdad. Replaced in October/November 947, he was appointed  of Egypt, Palestine, and parts of Syria. 

In 973/4 he was appointed chief  in Baghdad, succeeding Ibn Ma'ruf, until he was dismissed in May/June 975. He died in November/December 979.

References

Sources
 

906 births
10th century in Iraq
10th-century people from the Abbasid Caliphate
979 deaths
Chief qadis of the Abbasid Caliphate
Buyid officials
Abbasids
People from Kufa